Aminiya School is a primary, secondary school in Malé, the capital of the Maldives. It is the first girls' secondary school in the country and remained the only all-girls school until 14 June 2011

It was established in 1944 to accommodate Female students from Majeediyya School (then known as "Madhrasathul Saniyya") which became an all-boy institution. The school is divided into four houses, namely Aminarani, Dhainkanba, Raadhafathi and ''Rehendhi."

Till 2011, the school remained as a secondary school for only girls. In 2011 the school established Primary, Grade 1 making it both a primary and secondary school. Now there are grades 1, 2, 3, 4, 5, 6 and 7 for the Primary, and grade 8, 9 and 10 for the Secondary. Aminiya school has high honours of prizes and a large number of Aminiya's most successful women came from here as students.

There are two sessions for grades 1 to 10 which are Morning session and Afternoon session. The Morning session starts at 6:45 for grades 6 to 10. The dismissal time for these grades varies by 15 with the exception of grade 6 which the dismissal time is 11:45, the normal dismissal time starts at 12:00 for 7th grade students, 15 minutes after that is the 8th grade, 15 minutes after 8th grade is the 9th and so on. 

Principal: Naazleen Wafir

Deputy principal: Fathimath Hilmy

Deputy principal: Suwaibath Saeed

See also
 List of schools in the Maldives

Educational institutions established in 1944
Schools in the Maldives
1944 establishments in the Maldives